The Malay Peninsula (Malay: Semenanjung Tanah Melayu) is a peninsula in Mainland Southeast Asia. The landmass runs approximately north–south, and at its terminus, it is the southernmost point of the Asian continental mainland. The area contains Peninsular Malaysia, Southern Thailand, and the southernmost tip of Myanmar (Kawthaung). The island country of Singapore also has historical and cultural ties with the region. The indigenous people of the peninsula are the Malays, an Austronesian people. 

The Titiwangsa Mountains are part of the Tenasserim Hills system and form the backbone of the peninsula and the southernmost section of the central cordillera, which runs from Tibet through the Kra Isthmus, the peninsula's narrowest point, into the Malay Peninsula. The Strait of Malacca separates the Malay Peninsula from the Indonesian island of Sumatra, and the south coast is separated from the island of Singapore by the Straits of Johor.

Etymology 
The Malay term Tanah Melayu is derived from the word Tanah (land) and Melayu (Malays), thus it means "the Malay land". The term can be found in various Malay texts, of which the oldest dating back to the early 17th century. It is frequently mentioned in the Hikayat Hang Tuah, a well-known classic tale associated with the legendary heroes of Malacca Sultanate. Tanah Melayu in the text is consistently employed to refer to the area under Malaccan dominance.

In the early 16th century, Tomé Pires, a Portuguese apothecary who stayed in Malacca from 1512 to 1515, uses an almost identical term, Terra de Tana Malaio, with which he referred to the southeastern part of Sumatra, where the deposed Sultan of Malacca, Mahmud Shah, established his exiled government. The 17th century's account of Portuguese historian, Emanuel Godinho de Erédia, noted on the region of Malaios surrounded by the Andaman Sea in the north, the entire Strait of Malacca in the centre, a part of Sunda Strait in the south, and the western part of South China Sea in the east.

Prior to the foundation of Malacca, ancient and medieval references to a Malay peninsula exist in various foreign sources. According to several Indian scholars, the word Malayadvipa ("mountain-insular continent"), mentioned in the ancient Indian text, Vayu Purana, may possibly refer to the Malay Peninsula. Another Indian source, an inscription on the south wall of the Brihadeeswarar Temple, recorded the word Malaiur, referring to a kingdom in the Malay Peninsula that had "a strong mountain for its rampart". Ptolemy's Geographia named a geographical region of the Golden Chersonese as Maleu-kolon, a term thought to derive from Sanskrit malayakolam or malaikurram. While the Chinese chronicle of the Yuan dynasty mentioned the word Ma-li-yu-er, referring to a nation of the Malay Peninsula that was threatened by the southward expansion of the Sukhothai Kingdom under King Ram Khamhaeng. During the same era, Marco Polo made a reference to Malauir in his travelogue, as a kingdom located in the Malay Peninsula, possibly similar to the one mentioned in the Yuan chronicle. The Malay Peninsula was conflated with Persia in old Japan, and was known by the same name.

In the early 20th century, the term Tanah Melayu was generally used by the Malays of the peninsula during the rise of Malay nationalism to describe uniting all Malay states on the peninsula under one Malay nation, and this ambition was largely realised with the formation of Persekutuan Tanah Melayu (Malay for "Federation of Malaya") in 1948.

Ecology
The Malay Peninsula is covered with tropical moist forests. Lowland forests are dominated by dipterocarp trees, while montane forests are home to evergreen trees in the beech family (Fagaceae), Myrtle family (Myrtaceae), laurel family (Lauraceae), tropical conifers, and other plant families.

The peninsula's forests are home to thousands of species of animals and plants. Several large endangered mammals inhabit the peninsula – Asian elephant (Elephas maximus), gaur (Bos gaurus), tiger (Panthera tigris), sun bear (Helarctos malayanus), Malayan tapir (Tapirus indicus), clouded leopard (Neofelis nebulosa), and siamang (Symphalangus syndactylus). The Sumatran rhinoceros (Dicerorhinus sumatrensis) once inhabited the forests, but Malaysia's last rhinoceroses died in 2019, and the species' few remaining members survive only in Sumatra.

The peninsula is home to several distinct ecoregions. The Tenasserim-South Thailand semi-evergreen rain forests cover the northern peninsula, including the Tenasserim Hills and the Isthmus of Kra, and extend to the coast on both sides of the isthmus.

The Kangar-Pattani floristic boundary crosses the peninsula in southern Thailand and northernmost Malaysia, marking the boundary between the large biogeographic regions of Indochina to the north and Sundaland and Malesia to the south. The forests north of the boundary are characterized by seasonally-deciduous trees, while the Sundaland forests have more year-round rainfall and the trees are mostly evergreen. Peninsular Malaysia is home to three terrestrial ecoregions. The Peninsular Malaysian montane rain forests ecoregion covers the mountains above 1000 meters elevation. The lowlands and hills are in the Peninsular Malaysian rain forests ecoregion. The Peninsular Malaysian peat swamp forests include distinctive waterlogged forests in the lowlands on both sides of the peninsula.

Extensive mangroves line both coasts. The Myanmar Coast mangroves are on the western shore of the peninsula, and the Indochina mangroves on the eastern shore.

See also 
 Extreme points of Asia
 Golden Chersonese
 Malay Archipelago
 Malaya (disambiguation)
 Tenasserim Hills
 Malaysia–Thailand border
 Geography of Malaysia

References

External links 

 

 
Andaman Sea
.02
Gulf of Thailand
Landforms of Malaysia
Landforms of Myanmar
Landforms of the South China Sea
Landforms of Thailand
.
Malesia
Peninsulas of Asia
Regions of Asia
.
Strait of Malacca
Articles containing video clips